The 1995 World Junior Figure Skating Championships was an international competition sanctioned by the International Skating Union. Medals were awarded in the four disciplines of men's singles, ladies' singles, pair skating, and ice dancing. The event took place on November 21–27, 1994 in Budapest, Hungary.

Medals table

Results
Skaters were exempt from the qualifying round if they were top-10 finishers the previous year.

Men

Ladies

Pairs

Ice dancing

References

External links
 Men's results
 Ladies' results

World Junior Figure Skating Championships
1994 in figure skating
F
World Junior 1995